The 1962 Oklahoma gubernatorial election was held on November 6, 1962, and was a race for Governor of Oklahoma. Republican  Henry Bellmon defeated Democrat W. P. Bill Atkinson and Independent L. Richard Zavitz to become the first Republican governor of Oklahoma. Former governor Raymond D. Gary, lieutenant governor George Nigh, Fred R. Harris, and State Treasurer William A. Burkhart unsuccessfully sought the Democratic nomination.

Results

References

1962
Gubernatorial
Okla